The Comptroller General's Department (CGD) is a Thai government agency under the Ministry of Finance.

History 
In accordance with the Royal Treasury Ministry Act, the Comptroller General's Department was established on 7 October 1890. It was originally named the Accountant-General's Department. Its core mission is to manage the nation's revenues and expenditures as well as royal accounts in order to ensure lawful use of the national budget to the country's benefit.

Missions 
The Comptroller General's Department has four main missions as follows: 
 Control of the disbursement of funds 
 Control of government spending 
 Control the government personnel budget
 Support the Ministry of Finance and Government policies

References 

Government departments of Thailand
Ministry of Finance (Thailand)